Gotita de gente (English: Droplet People), is a Mexican children's telenovela, which was produced by Valentín Pimstein for Televisa in 1978. Stars in it included main actors Graciela Mauri, Liliana Abud and Jorge Ortiz de Pinedo.

Is an adaptation of the Brazilian telenovela "Pingo (small, the word "pingo" has different connotations across Latin America) de gente", which was produced in 1971 by Raimundo López.

Plot 
Little Ana María is snatched a few days after her birth from the arms of her mother Martha, a young woman, and is then taken to an orphanage located in the town of San Juan del Río. Nine years later the girl, tired of the abuse that has been in place at the orphanage, escapes and hides in a truck that takes her to Mexico City, arriving in a neighborhood where young Juan Bautista Martínez, who finds the girl sleeping in a hard position inside the truck, lives at.

Cast 
 Graciela Mauri as Ana María
 Liliana Abud as Martha Rivera Valdés
 Jorge Ortiz de Pinedo as Juan Bautista Martínez
 Alicia Rodríguez as Doña Margarita
 Raúl "Chato" Padilla as Tacho
 Mercedes Pascual as Doña Carlota
 Leticia Perdigón as Sofía
 Martha Ofelia Galindo as Teresa
 Juan Verduzco as Eugenio
 Sergio Ramos "El Comanche" as Clodomiro
 Estela Chacón as Hermana Marcela
 Jorge Mateos as José
 Rafael del Río as Flavio
 María Idalia
 Pancho Müller
 Angelines Fernández
 Rafael Banquells

See also 
Chiquititas
Luz Clarita
Gotitas de Amor

References

External links 

Mexican telenovelas
1978 telenovelas
1978 Mexican television series debuts
1978 Mexican television series endings
Televisa telenovelas
Children's telenovelas
Mexican television series based on Brazilian television series
Spanish-language telenovelas
Television series about orphans